Enchanted is a 2007 American live-action/animated musical fantasy romantic comedy film directed by Kevin Lima and written by Bill Kelly. Co-produced by Walt Disney Pictures, Josephson Entertainment and Right Coast Productions, the film stars Amy Adams, Patrick Dempsey, James Marsden, Timothy Spall, Idina Menzel, Rachel Covey and Susan Sarandon, with Julie Andrews as the narrator. It focuses on an archetypal Disney princess-to-be exiled from her animated world into the live-action world of New York City.

The film is both a homage to and a self-parody of Disney's animated features, making numerous references to past works through the combination of live-action filmmaking, traditional animation, and computer-generated imagery. It also marks the return of traditional animation to a Disney feature film after the company's decision to move entirely to computer animation in 2004. Composer Alan Menken and lyricist Stephen Schwartz, who had written songs for previous Disney films, wrote and produced the songs of Enchanted, and Menken also composed the film's score. The animated sequences were produced at James Baxter Animation in Pasadena, while filming of the live-action segments took place around New York City.

Enchanted premiered on October 20, 2007 at the London Film Festival, and went into its wide release in the United States on November 21. It was critically well-received, established Adams as a leading lady, and earned more than $340 million worldwide at the box office. It won three Saturn Awards, Best Fantasy Film, Best Actress for Adams and Best Music for Menken. Enchanted also received two nominations at the 65th Golden Globe Awards and three Best Original Song nominations at the 80th Academy Awards. This is the first Walt Disney Pictures film to be distributed by Walt Disney Studios Motion Pictures after Disney retired the Buena Vista brand from its distribution division. A sequel, Disenchanted, was released on Disney+ on November 18, 2022.

Plot

In the animated fairy tale kingdom of Andalasia, the corrupt and ruthless Queen Narissa plots to protect her claim to the throne, which she will lose once her stepson, Prince Edward, finds his true love and marries. She enlists her loyal servant Nathaniel to keep Edward distracted by hunting trolls. Giselle, a young woman, dreams of meeting a prince and experiencing a "happily ever after". She, her chipmunk friend Pip, and animals from the forest work together to make a homemade statue of her true love. Edward hears Giselle singing and sets off to find her. Nathaniel frees a captured troll to kill Giselle, but Edward rescues her. She and Edward are instantly attracted to each other and plan to be married the following day.

Disguised as an old hag, Narissa intercepts Giselle on her way to the wedding and pushes her into a well, where Giselle is transformed into a live-action version of herself and transported to New York City's Times Square in the real world. A frightened Giselle quickly becomes lost. Meanwhile, Robert, a divorce lawyer, plans to propose to his girlfriend Nancy. Robert and his young daughter Morgan encounter Giselle on their way home, and Robert reluctantly allows Giselle to stay in their apartment at the insistence of Morgan, who believes Giselle is a princess.

Pip and Edward embark on a rescue mission to the real world, where they too are turned into live-action versions of themselves. Pip, now a real chipmunk, is no longer able to speak, and only communicates through squeaks. Narissa sends Nathaniel to follow and impede Edward. Narissa gives Nathaniel three poisoned apples that will put whoever eats one to sleep until the clock strikes twelve, after which they will die. Meanwhile, after Giselle summons insects and vermin to clean Robert's apartment, Nancy arrives to take Morgan to school. She meets Giselle and leaves, assuming Robert was unfaithful. Robert is initially upset, but he spends the day with Giselle, knowing she is vulnerable in the city. Giselle questions Robert about his relationship with Nancy, and helps the pair reconcile by sending Nancy flowers and an invitation to a costume ball at the Woolworth Building.

Edward locates Giselle at Robert's apartment. While Edward is eager to take Giselle home to Andalasia and marry her, she suggests that they should first go on a date and get to know each other better. Giselle promises to return to Andalasia after the ball that night, which Robert and Nancy also attend. Narissa decides to come to the real world and kill Giselle herself after Nathaniel fails twice to poison her. At the ball, Robert and Giselle dance romantically with each other. Giselle and Edward then prepare to depart, but Giselle feels depressed at leaving Robert behind. Narissa appears as the old hag and offers the last poisoned apple to Giselle, promising that it will wipe her memories. Giselle takes a bite and is plunged into a sleep with mere minutes to live.

Narissa tries escaping with Giselle's body but is thwarted by Edward. Nathaniel, seeing that Narissa never cared about him, reveals her plot and apologizes for his previous actions. Robert realizes that true love's kiss is the only force powerful enough to break the apple's curse. Edward's kiss fails to wake Giselle, and so he and Nancy prompt Robert to kiss her instead. When Robert kisses her, she awakens. Infuriated, Narissa transforms into a dragon and takes Robert hostage. Giselle takes Edward's sword and pursues Narissa to the top of the building to rescue Robert. Pip comes to support Giselle and defeats Narissa by causing her to fall to her death on the streets below and explode into dust. Robert almost falls as well, but Giselle catches him, and they share another kiss on the roof.

A happy new life unfolds for everyone, showing Edward and Nancy falling in love and marrying in Andalasia while Nathaniel, who stays in New York, and Pip, who returns to Andalasia, each write autobiographies based on their experiences in the real world. Giselle starts a very popular fashion design business and forms a happy family with Robert and Morgan in New York.

Cast

 Amy Adams as Giselle, a singing and dancing princess-to-be who ends up almost having her dream of meeting her prince a reality. Adams was announced to have been cast in the role of Giselle on November 14, 2005. Although the studio was looking for a film star in the role, director Kevin Lima insisted on casting a lesser-known actress. Out of the 300 or so actresses who auditioned for the role, Adams stood out to Lima because not only did she look like a Disney princess but her "commitment to the character, her ability to escape into the character's being without ever judging the character was overwhelming". Hailing from Andalasia, Giselle displays similar traits to early Disney Princesses; Lima describes her as "about 80% Snow White, with some traits borrowed from Cinderella and Princess Aurora from Sleeping Beauty... although her spunkiness comes from Ariel from The Little Mermaid". She is "eternally optimistic and romantic" but is also "very independent and true to her convictions". Over the course of the film, she becomes more mature (even stopping her habit of singing in a continuous manner) but maintains her fondness of singing, kindness, innocence and optimism.
 Patrick Dempsey as Robert Philip, a cynical Manhattan divorce attorney who does not believe in true love, happily-ever-after, or fairy tales since his wife left him and their daughter. He falls in love with Giselle after her adventure to New York City, and her sense of fun gradually rubs off on him over the course of the film. Lima cast Dempsey after Disney was satisfied with the casting of Adams but had wanted more well-known actors in the film. Dempsey, whose starring role on TV series Grey's Anatomy had earned him the nickname "McDreamy", was described by Lima as "a modern-day Prince Charming to today's audience". The role was challenging for Dempsey because he had to play the straight man to Adams' and Marsden's more outrageous characters.
 James Marsden as Prince Edward, a dim-witted, yet brave, heroic and good-hearted, prince who ends up confused with the world of New York once he enters it. Marsden was announced to have been cast on December 6, 2005. At the time Marsden was auditioning, the role of Robert had not been cast but he decided to pursue the role of Prince Edward because he was "more fun and he responded more to that character". Edward is a prince in Andalasia and the stepson of Queen Narissa. He is "very pure, very simple-minded and naive, but innocently narcissistic".
 Timothy Spall as Nathaniel, a servant of Queen Narissa, who gets controlled through his infatuation with the Queen and his own lack of self-esteem. He initially does Narissa's bidding, but ultimately realizes her true nature and rebels against her. He has a penchant for disguises.
 Idina Menzel as Nancy Tremaine, a fashion designer and Robert's girlfriend. Once Giselle falls in love with Robert, she falls for Edward and leaves with him. Since the role did not require any singing, Menzel said in an interview that "it was a compliment to be asked to just be hired on my acting talents alone". She is named after Lady Tremaine, the stepmother from Cinderella.
 Rachel Covey as Morgan Philip, Robert's 6-year-old daughter. Despite her father misunderstanding her and telling her otherwise, she believes in fairy tales and also believes that magic exists.
 Susan Sarandon as Queen Narissa, Edward's evil stepmother, a sorceress, and a megalomaniac with a hatred for Giselle simply for being an obstacle for her to keep her power. Sarandon had been attracted to the project prior to Lima's involvement as director. Since Sarandon's on-screen time was relatively short, it took only two weeks to film her scenes. Narissa's mannerisms, characteristics, powers, and physical features were inspired by such classical Disney villainesses as the Evil Queen from Snow White and the Seven Dwarfs and Maleficent from Sleeping Beauty.

Giselle's chipmunk friend Pip is portrayed by Jeff Bennett in Andalasia, where he has no trouble expressing himself through speech, while Lima provides the voice for Pip in the real world, where he must communicate through squeaks and charades. Other voice actors in the animated portion of the film include Lima's daughter Emma Rose Lima as Bluebird and Fawn, Teala Dunn as Bunny, Fred Tatasciore as the Troll, and Frank Welker as Destiny, Prince Edward's horse. Julie Andrews provides the film's narration.

Additionally, veteran Disney Princess voice actors Jodi Benson, Paige O'Hara and Judy Kuhn cameo, respectively, as Robert's secretary Sam, the soap opera character Angela, and a pregnant woman Prince Edward encounters. John Rothman portrays Robert's boss Carl, and Tonya Pinkins and Isiah Whitlock Jr. play Phoebe and Ethan Banks, a couple whose divorce Robert is mediating. Marlon Saunders and Jon McLaughlin appear as vocalists who sing "That's How You Know" and "So Close", respectively.

Production

Development
The initial script of Enchanted, written by Bill Kelly, was bought by Disney's Touchstone Pictures and Sonnenfeld/Josephson Productions for a reported sum of $450,000 in September 1997. The script was written for three years, but it was thought to be unsuitable for Walt Disney Pictures because it was "a racier R-rated movie", inspired by the adult-risque comedy movies in the 1980s and 1990s such as Fast Times at Ridgemont High and American Pie. The first draft of the script had Giselle being mistaken for a stripper when she arrives in New York City. To the frustration of Kelly, the screenplay was rewritten several times, first by Rita Hsiao and then by Todd Alcott. The film was initially scheduled to be released in 2002 with Rob Marshall as director but he withdrew due to "creative differences" between the producers and him. In 2001, director Jon Turteltaub was set to direct the film but he left soon after, later working with Disney and Jerry Bruckheimer on the National Treasure franchise. Adam Shankman became the film's director in 2003, while Bob Schooley and Mark McCorkle were hired by Disney to rewrite the script once again. At the time, Disney considered offering the role of Giselle to Kate Hudson or Reese Witherspoon. However, the project did not take off.

On May 25, 2005, Variety reported that Kevin Lima had been hired as director and Bill Kelly had returned to the project to write a new version of the script. Lima worked with Kelly on the script to combine the main plot of Enchanted with the idea of a "loving homage" to Disney's heritage. He created visual storyboard printouts that covered the story of Enchanted from beginning to end, which filled an entire floor of a production building. After Lima showed them to Dick Cook, the chairman of the Walt Disney Studios, he received the green light for the project and a budget of $85 million. Lima began designing the world of Andalasia and storyboarding the movie before a cast was chosen to play the characters. After the actors were hired, he was involved in making the final design of the movie, which made sure the animated characters look like their real-life counterparts.

Filming
Enchanted is the first feature-length Disney live-action/traditional animation hybrid since Disney's Who Framed Roger Rabbit in 1988, though the traditionally animated characters do not interact in the live-action environment in the same method as they did in Roger Rabbit; however, there are some scenes where live-action characters share the screen with two-dimensional animated characters, for example, a live-action Nathaniel communicating with a cel-drawn Narissa, who is in a cooking pot. The film uses two aspect ratios; it begins in 2.35:1 when the Walt Disney Pictures logo and Enchanted storybook are shown, and then switches to a smaller 1.85:1 aspect ratio for the first animated sequence. The film switches back to 2.35:1 when it becomes live-action and never switches back, even for the remainder of the animated sequences. When this movie was aired on televised networks, the beginning of the movie (minus the logo and opening credits) was shown in the pillarboxed 4:3 aspect ratio; the remainder of the movie was shown in the 16:9 aspect ratio when it becomes live-action. Lima oversaw the direction of both the live-action and animation sequences, which were being produced at the same time. Enchanted took almost two years to complete. The animation took about a year to finish while the live-action scenes, which commenced filming on location in New York City during the summer of 2006 and were completed during the animation process, were shot in 72 days.

Animation
Out of the film's 107 minutes of running time, ten of the approximately 13 minutes of animation are at the beginning of the film. Lima tried to "cram every single piece of Disney iconic imagery" that he could into the first ten minutes, which were done in traditional cel animation (in contrast to computer-generated 3-D animation) as a tribute to past Disney fairy tale films such as Sleeping Beauty, Cinderella, and Snow White and the Seven Dwarfs. It was the first Disney film theatrically released in America to feature traditional cel animation since Pooh's Heffalump Movie (2005). This film, although quite different in terms of plot from any previous Disney film, also contained obvious homages to other Disney films of the distant past, such as Old Yeller, The Shaggy Dog, Swiss Family Robinson, Bon Voyage!, and Savage Sam. As most of Disney's traditional animation artists were laid off after the computer graphics boom of the late 1990s, the 13 minutes of animation were not done in-house but by the independent Pasadena-based company James Baxter Animation, founded by former Disney animator Baxter.

Although Lima wanted the animation to be nostalgic, he wanted Enchanted to have a style of its own. Baxter's team decided to use Art Nouveau as a starting point. For Giselle, the hand-drawn animated character had to be "a cross between Amy Adams and a classic Disney princess. And not a caricature." Seeing Giselle as "a forest girl, an innocent nymph with flowers in her hair" and "a bit of a hippie", the animators wanted her to be "flowing, with her hair and clothes. Delicate." For Prince Edward, Baxter's team "worked the hardest on him to make him look like the actor" because princes "in these kinds of movies are usually so bland." Many prototypes were made for Narissa as Baxter's team wanted her face to "look like Susan Sarandon. And the costumes had to align closely to the live-action design."

To maintain continuity between the two media, Lima brought in costume designer Mona May during the early stages of the film's production so the costumes would be aligned in both the animated and live-action worlds. He also shot some live-action footage of Amy Adams as Giselle for the animators to use as reference, which also allowed the physical movement of the character to match in both worlds. Test scenes completed by the animators were shown to the actors, allowing them to see how their animated selves would move.

Live-action

Principal photography began in April 2006 and ended in July. Because of the sequence setting, the live action scenes were filmed in New York City. However, shooting in New York became problematic as it was in a "constant state of new stores, scaffolding and renovation".

The first scene in New York, which features Giselle emerging from a manhole in the middle of Times Square, was filmed on location in the center of the square. Because of the difficulties in controlling the crowd while filming in Times Square, general pedestrians were featured in the scene with hired extras placed in the immediate foreground. Similarly, a crowd gathered to watch as James Marsden and Timothy Spall filmed their scenes in Times Square. However, the scene Lima found the most challenging to shoot was the musical number, "That's How You Know", in Central Park. The five-minute scene took 17 days to finish due to the changing weather, which allowed only seven sunny days for the scene to be filmed. The filming was also hampered at times by Patrick Dempsey's fans. The scene was choreographed by John O'Connell, who had worked on Moulin Rouge! beforehand, and included 300 extras and 150 dancers.

Many scenes were filmed at Steiner Studios, which provided the three large stages that Enchanted needed at the same facility. Other outdoor locations included the Brooklyn Bridge and The Paterno, an apartment building with a curved, heavily embellished, ivory-colored façade located on the corner of Riverside Drive and 116th Street, which is the residence of the film's characters Robert and Morgan.

Costume design

All the costumes in the film were designed by Mona May, who had previously worked on Clueless (1995), The Wedding Singer (1998), and The Haunted Mansion (2003). To create the costumes, May spent one year in pre-production working with animators and her costume department of twenty people, while she contracted with five outside costume shops in Los Angeles and New York City. She became involved in the project during the time when the animators were designing the faces and bodies of the characters as they had to "translate the costumes from two-dimensional drawings to live-action human proportion". Her goal was to keep the designs "Disneyesque to the core but bring a little bit of fashion in there and humor and make it something new". However, May admitted this was difficult "because they're dealing with iconic Disney characters who have been in the psyche of the viewing audience for so long".

For the character of Giselle, her journey to becoming a real woman is reflected in her dresses, which become less fairy tale-like as the film progresses. Her wedding dress at the beginning of the film directly contrasts her modern gown at the end of the film. The wedding dress served to provide a "humongous contrast to the flat drawings" and to accentuate the image of a Disney Princess. In order to make the waist look small, the sleeves are designed to be "extremely pouffy" and the skirt to be as big as possible, which included a metal hoop that holds up twenty layers of petticoats and ruffles. Altogether, eleven versions of the dress were made for filming, each made of 200 yards (183 m) of silk satin and other fabric, and weighing approximately 40 pounds (18 kg). On the experience of wearing the wedding dress, Amy Adams described it as "grueling" since "the entire weight was on her hips, so occasionally it felt like she was in traction".

Unlike Giselle, Prince Edward does not adapt to the real world and James Marsden, who plays Edward, had only one costume designed for him. May's aim was to try "not to lose Marsden in the craziness of the outfit... where he still looks handsome". The costume also included padding in the chest, buttocks, and crotch, which gave Marsden the "same exaggerated proportions as an animated character" and "posture – his back is straight, the sleeves are up and never collapse".

May was delighted that Lima "went for something more fashion-forward" with Susan Sarandon's Queen Narissa. She decided to make her look like a "runway lady", wearing something that is "still Disney" but also "high fashion, like something John Galliano or Thierry Mugler might design". Since Narissa appears in three media: hand drawn animation, live-action, and computer animation, May had to make sure that the costume would be the same throughout in terms of "color, shape, and texture". The costume for Narissa consisted of a leather corset and skirt, which looked "reptilian", as well as a cape. Working with the animators, May incorporated parts of the dragon's form into the costume; the cape was designed to look like wings, the layers of the skirt wrap around like a tail and a crown that would turn into horns during Narissa's transformation into a dragon.

Music

The film's score was written by accomplished songwriter and composer Alan Menken, who has worked on a number of Disney films previously. Fellow composer Stephen Schwartz wrote the lyrics for six songs, also composed by Menken. Menken and Schwartz previously worked together on the songs for Pocahontas and The Hunchback of Notre Dame.

Menken became involved with the film in the early stages of the film's development and invited Schwartz to resume their collaboration. They began the songwriting process by searching for the right moments in the story in which a song moment was allowed. Schwartz found that it was easier to justify situations in which the characters would burst into songs in Enchanted than in other live-action musicals as its concept "allowed the characters to sing in a way that was completely integral to the plot of the story." The three songs Giselle sings contain references to earlier Disney films. The first song played in the film, "True Love's Kiss", was written to be "a send-up of, and an homage to, the style of those Disney animated features", namely, "I'm Wishing" (Snow White and the Seven Dwarfs) and "A Dream is a Wish Your Heart Makes" (Cinderella), during which Disney heroines sing about the joy of being loved. It posed a challenge for Menken and Schwartz because of the "many preconceptions with that number"; it had to be reflective of the era of Snow White and the Seven Dwarfs and Cinderella. Accordingly, Amy Adams performed the first song in an operetta style in contrast to the Broadway style of the later songs.

Both "Happy Working Song" and "That's How You Know" also pay tributes to past Disney songs and movies. "Happy Working Song" pays a lyrical homage to such songs as "Whistle While You Work" (Snow White and the Seven Dwarfs), "The Work Song" (Cinderella), "A Spoonful of Sugar" (Mary Poppins) and "Making Christmas" (The Nightmare Before Christmas), and a musical homage to the Sherman Brothers (with a self-parodic "Alan Menken style" middle eight). "That's How You Know" is a self-parody of Menken's compositions for his Disney features, specifically such big production numbers as "Under the Sea" (The Little Mermaid) and "Be Our Guest" (Beauty and the Beast). To achieve this, Schwartz admitted he had to "push it a little bit further in terms of choices of words or certain lyrics" while maintaining "the classic Walt Disney sensibility". However, Menken noted that the songs he has written for Disney have always been "a little tongue-in-cheek". As the film progresses, the music uses more contemporary styles, which is heard through the adult ballad "So Close" and the country/pop number "Ever Ever After" (sung by Carrie Underwood as a voice-over).

Out of the six completed songs written and composed by Menken and Schwartz, five remained in the finished film. The title song, "Enchanted," a duet featuring Idina Menzel and James Marsden, was the only song of Menken's and Schwartz's authorship and composition that was deleted from the movie.

Effects
The majority of the visual effects shots in Enchanted were done by Tippett Studio in Berkeley, California, who contributed a total of 320 shots. These shots involved virtual sets, environmental effects and CG characters that performed alongside real actors, namely the animated animals during the "Happy Working Song" sequence, Pip and the Narissa dragon during the live-action portions of the film. CIS Hollywood was responsible for 36 visual effects shots, which primarily dealt with wire removals and composites. Reel FX Creative Studios did four visual effects shots involving the pop-up book page-turn transitions while Weta Digital did two.

Out of all the animals that appear in the "Happy Working Song" sequence, the only real animals filmed on set were rats and pigeons. The real animals captured on film aided Tippett Studio in creating CG rats and pigeons, which gave dynamic performances such as having pigeons that carried brooms in their beaks and rats that scrubbed with toothbrushes. On the other hand, all the cockroaches were CG characters.

Pip, a chipmunk who can talk in the 2D world of Andalasia, loses his ability to communicate through speech in the real world so he must rely heavily on facial and body gestures. This meant the animators had to display Pip's emotions through performance as well as making him appear like a real chipmunk. The team at Tippett began the process of animating Pip by observing live chipmunks which were filmed in motion from "every conceivable angle", after which they created a photorealistic chipmunk through the use of 3D computer graphics software, Maya and Furrocious. When visual effects supervisor Thomas Schelesny showed the first animation of Pip to director Kevin Lima, he was surprised that he was a looking at a CG character and not reference footage. To enhance facial expressions, the modelers gave Pip eyebrows, which real chipmunks do not have. During the filming of scenes in which Pip appears, a number of ways were used to indicate the physical presence of Pip. On some occasions, a small stuffed chipmunk with a wire armature on the inside was placed in the scene. In other situations, a rod with a small marker on the end or a laser pointer would be used to show the actors and cinematographer where Pip is.

Unlike Pip, the Narissa dragon was allowed to be more of a fantasy character while still looking like a living character and a classic Disney villain. The CG dragon design was loosely based on a traditional Chinese dragon and Susan Sarandon's live-action witch. When filming the scene which sees the transformation of Narissa from a woman into a dragon, a long pole was used to direct the extras' eyelines instead of a laser pointer. Set pieces were made to move back and forth in addition to having a computer-controlled lighting setup and a repeatable head on the camera that were all synchronized. In the film's final sequence, in which Narissa climbs the Woolworth Building while clutching Robert in her claws, a greenscreen rig was built to hold Patrick Dempsey in order to film his face and movements. The rig was a "puppeteering" approach that involved a robotic arm being controlled by three different floor effects artists.

Release
The film was distributed by Walt Disney Studios Motion Pictures to 3,730 theaters in the United States. It was distributed worldwide by Walt Disney Studios Motion Pictures International to over 50 territories around the world and topped the box office in several countries including the United Kingdom and Italy. It is the first movie to be released under the Walt Disney Studios Motion Pictures name following the retirement of the previous Buena Vista Pictures Distribution.

Merchandising 
Disney had originally planned to add Giselle to the Disney Princess line-up, as it was shown at a 2007 Toy Fair where the Giselle doll was featured with packaging declaring her with Disney Princess status, but decided against it when they realized they would have to pay for lifelong rights to Amy Adams' image. While Giselle is not being marketed as one of the Disney Princesses, Enchanted merchandise was made available in various outlets with Adams' animated likeness being used on all Giselle merchandise. Giselle led the 2007 Hollywood Holly-Day Parade at Disney's Hollywood Studios. She was also featured in the 2007 Walt Disney World Christmas Day Parade in the Magic Kingdom with the official Disney Princesses.

A video game based on the film was released for Nintendo DS and mobile phones in addition to a Game Boy Advance title, Enchanted: Once Upon Andalasia, which is a prequel to the film, about Giselle and Pip rescuing Andalasia from a magic spell.

Home media 
Enchanted was released on Blu-ray Disc and DVD by Walt Disney Studios Home Entertainment on March 18, 2008, in the United States. While Enchanted topped the DVD sales chart on the week of its release in the United States, narrowly defeating the DVD sales of I Am Legend, the Blu-ray Disc sales of I Am Legend were nearly four times the number of Blu-ray Disc sales of Enchanted. Overall, Enchanted was the eighth best-selling film on home video with 5.3 million units sold and earning a revenue of $86.3 million. The DVD was released in United Kingdom and Europe on April 7, 2008, Australia on May 21, 2008 and in other 50 international countries on 2008.

The bonus features included on both the Blu-ray Disc and DVD are "Fantasy Comes to Life", a three-part behind-the-scenes feature including "Happy Working Song", "That's How You Know" and "A Blast at the Ball"; six deleted scenes with brief introductions by director Kevin Lima; bloopers; "Pip's Predicament: A Pop-Up Adventure", a short in pop-up storybook style; and Carrie Underwood's music video for "Ever Ever After". Featured on the Blu-ray disc only is a trivia game titled "The D Files" that runs throughout the movie with high scoring players given access to videos "So Close", "Making Ever Ever After" and "True Love's Kiss". In the United States, certain DVDs at Target stores contain a bonus DVD with a 30-minute-long making-of documentary titled Becoming Enchanted: A New Classic Comes True. This DVD is also sold with certain DVDs at HMV stores in the United Kingdom.

On November 12, 2021, the film was added to Disney+ to coincide with Disney+ Day. On October 26, 2022, the film was upgraded to 4K resolution on Disney+.

Reception

Box office 
Enchanted earned $8 million on the day of its release in the United States, placing at #1. It was also placed at #1 on Thanksgiving Day, earning $6.7 million to bring its two-day total to $14.6 million. The film grossed $14.4 million on the following day, bringing its total haul to $29.0 million placing ahead of other contenders. Enchanted made $34.4 million on the Friday-Sunday period in 3,730 theaters for a per-location average of $9,472 and $49.1 million over the five-day Thanksgiving holiday in 3,730 theaters for a per-location average of $13,153. Its earnings over the five-day holiday exceeded projections by $7 million. Ranking as the second-highest Thanksgiving opening after Toy Story 2, which earned $80.1 million over the five-day holiday in 1999, Enchanted is the first film to open at #1 on the Thanksgiving frame in the 21st century.

In its second weekend, Enchanted was also the #1 film, grossing a further $16.4 million at 3,730 locations for a per-theater average of $4,397. It dropped to #2 in its third weekend, with a gross of $10.7 million in 3,520 theaters for a per-theater average of $3,042. It finished its fourth weekend at #4 with a gross of $5.5 million in 3,066 locations for a per-theater average of $1,804. Enchanted earned a gross of $127.8 million in the United States and Canada as well as a total of $340.5 million worldwide. It was the 15th highest-grossing film worldwide released in 2007.

Critical response
On review aggregation website Rotten Tomatoes, the film has an approval of 93% based on 192 reviews, with an average score of 7.30/10. The site's critical consensus reads: "A smart re-imagining of fairy tale tropes that's sure to delight children and adults, Enchanted features witty dialogue, sharp animation, and a star turn by Amy Adams." Metacritic gave it a rating of 75 out of 100 based on 32 reviews, indicating "generally favorable reviews". Rotten Tomatoes ranked the film as the ninth best reviewed film in wide release of 2007 and named it the best family film of 2007. Audiences surveyed by CinemaScore gave the film a grade "A-" on scale of A to F.

Positive reviews praised the film's take on a classic Disney story, its comedy and musical numbers as well as the performance of its lead actress, Amy Adams. Roger Ebert of Chicago Sun-Times gave the film three stars out of four, describing it as a "heart-winning musical comedy that skips lightly and sprightly from the lily pads of hope to the manhole covers of actuality" and one that "has a Disney willingness to allow fantasy into life". Film critics of Variety and LA Weekly remarked on the film's ability to cater for all ages. LA Weekly described the film as "the sort of buoyant, all-ages entertainment that Hollywood has been laboring to revive in recent years (most recently with Hairspray) but hasn't managed to get right until now" while Todd McCarthy of Variety commented, "More than Disney's strictly animated product, Enchanted, in the manner of the vast majority of Hollywood films made until the '60s, is a film aimed at the entire population – niches be damned. It simply aims to please, without pandering, without vulgarity, without sops to pop-culture fads, and to pull this off today is no small feat." Enchanted was the Broadcast Film Critics Association's choice for Best Family Film of 2007 while Carrie Rickey of The Philadelphia Inquirer named it the 4th best film of 2007.

Rolling Stone, Premiere, USA Today, and The Boston Globe all gave the film three out of four, while The Baltimore Sun gave the film a B grade. They cited that although the story is relatively predictable, the way in which the predictability of the film is part of the story, the amazingly extravagant musical numbers, along with the way in which Disney pokes fun at its traditional line of animated movies outweighs any squabbles about storyline or being unsure of what age bracket the film is made for. Michael Sragow of The Baltimore Sun remarked that the film's "piquant idea and enough good jokes to overcome its uneven movie-making and uncertain tone", while Claudia Puig of USA Today stated that "though it's a fairly predictable fish-out-of-water tale (actually a princess-out-of-storybook saga), the casting is so perfect that it takes what could have been a ho-hum idea and renders it magical."

Amy Adams herself garnered many favorable reviews. Reviewers praised her singing ability and asserted that her performance, which was compared by some to her Academy Award-nominated performance in Junebug, has made Adams a movie star, likening it to Mary Poppins effect on Julie Andrews' career. Similarly, film critics Richard Roeper and Michael Phillips, who gave the film positive reviews on At the Movies with Ebert & Roeper, emphasized the effect of Adams' performance on the film with remarks like "Amy Adams is this movie" and "Amy Adams shows how to make a comic cliché work like magic." However, both agreed that the final sequence involving the computer-generated dragon "bogged down" the film.

Empire stated that the film was targeted at children but agreed with other reviewers that the "extremely game cast" was the film's best asset. It gave the film three out of five. TIME gave the film a C−, stating that the film "cannibalizes Walt's vault for jokes" and "fails to find a happy ending that doesn't feel two-dimensional". Peter Bradshaw of The Guardian gave the film two out of five and commented that the film "assumes a beady-eyed and deeply humourless sentimentality" and that Adams' performance was the "only decent thing in this overhyped family movie covered in a cellophane shrink-wrap of corporate Disney plastic-ness".

Accolades

Disney references
According to director Kevin Lima, "thousands" of references are made to past and future works of Disney in Enchanted, which serve as both a parody of and a "giant love letter to Disney classics". It took almost eight years for Walt Disney Studios to greenlight the production of the film because it "was always quite nervous about the tone in particular". As Lima worked with Bill Kelly, the writer, to inject Disney references to the plot, it became "an obsession"; he derived the name of every character as well as anything that needed a name from past Disney films to bring in more Disney references.

While Disney animators have occasionally inserted a Disney character into background shots – for example, Donald Duck appears in a crowd in The Little Mermaid – they have avoided "mingling characters" from other Disney films for fear of weakening their individual mythologies. In Enchanted, characters from past Disney films are openly seen, such as the appearances of Thumper and Flower from Bambi in the 2D animation portion of the film. Disney references are also made through camera work, sets, costumes, music and dialogue. Some of the more familiar examples include the use of poisoned apples from Snow White and the Seven Dwarfs and True Love's Kiss from Snow White and Sleeping Beauty. Dick Cook, the chairman of Walt Disney Studios, admitted that part of the goal of Enchanted was to create a new franchise (through the character of Giselle) and to revive the older ones.

Sequel

A sequel to the film, entitled Disenchanted, was released to Disney+ on November 18, 2022. The film featured Adams, Dempsey, Menzel, and Marsden reprising their roles. Newcomer Gabriella Baldacchino replaced Covey as Morgan, though Covey has a brief cameo in the film. They were joined by Maya Rudolph, Jayma Mays, and Yvette Nicole Brown as new characters. It was directed by Adam Shankman and received a mixed reception from critics.

References

External links

 
 
 
 
 
 
 

 
2007 films
2007 fantasy films
2007 romantic comedy films
2000s English-language films
2000s fantasy comedy films
2000s musical comedy films
2000s musical fantasy films
2000s parody films
2000s romantic fantasy films
2000s romantic musical films
American animated fantasy films
American fantasy comedy films
American films with live action and animation
American musical comedy films
American musical fantasy films
American romantic comedy films
American romantic fantasy films
American romantic musical films
Disney parodies
Metafictional works
Fairy tale parody films
Magic realism films
Films about divorce
Films about dragons
Films about lawyers
Films about princesses
Films about royalty
Films about shapeshifting
Films about trolls
Films about witchcraft
Films directed by Kevin Lima
Films produced by Barry Sonnenfeld
Films scored by Alan Menken
Films set in New York City
Films shot in New York City
Walt Disney Pictures films
2000s American films
Films about single parent families